The Diocese of Chișinău (in Latin: ,) is a Latin Church ecclesiastical territory or diocese of the Catholic Church covering all of Moldova and the territory of the self-proclaimed state of Transnistria.
 
It is exempt, meaning that it is directly subordinate to the Holy See, not part of any ecclesiastical province with a metropolitan bishop.

History 
On 28 October 1993, it was established as the Apostolic Administration of Moldova (a missionary pre-diocesan jurisdiction), on territories split off from the Diocese of Iași (in Romania) and the Diocese of Tiraspol (later suppressed).

On 27 October 2001, it was promoted and renamed after its see (the national capital) as Diocese of Chișinău, to which the apostolic administrator was appointed as first residential bishop.

Cathedral 
The Cathedral of Chișinău is dedicated to the Divine Providence.

Ordinaries 
(all Roman Rite)
 Apostolic administrator of Moldova (1993–2001) 
 October 28, 1993 – October 27, 2001 : Anton Coşa, Titular Bishop of Pesto (see) (1999.10.30 – 2001.10.27)

 Exempt Bishop of Chișinău (2001– ) 
 since October 27, 2001 : Anton Coşa

References

External links
 
   on www.catholic-hierarchy.org
   on www.gcatholic.org, with incumbent biography links

Roman Catholic dioceses in Europe
Organizations based in Chișinău
1993 establishments in Moldova